The Florida Film Critics Circle Award for Best Screenplay is an award given by the Florida Film Critics Circle to honor the finest achievementes in film-making. The award has been split into two categories, Best Adapted Screenplay and Best Original Screenplay, since 2010.

Winners

1990s

2000s

2010s

2020s

References

Florida Film Critics Circle Awards
Screenwriting awards for film